Yangon Planetarium is a planetarium located in Myanmar's largest city, Yangon. It presents a half-hour star show illuminated against the planetarium's domes ceiling. The building was donated by the government of Japan in 1987. On the grounds, there is also a 70s-era Myanma Airways plane exhibited a walk-thru exhibit.

References

Museums in Yangon
Museums in Myanmar
Planetaria